Milešov is a municipality and village in Příbram District in the Central Bohemian Region of the Czech Republic. It has about 300 inhabitants.

Administrative parts
Villages of Klenovice and Přední Chlum are administrative parts of Milešov.

References

Villages in Příbram District